The Phelps School is an independent, all-boys boarding school in Malvern, Pennsylvania, United States.

Athletics
Phelps won the 2015  Pennsylvania Independent Schools Athletic Association (PAISAA) boys basketball championship.

Notable alumni
 Terry Larrier – professional basketball player
 Quincy McKnight – professional basketball player
 Matthew Mellon – businessman
 Kyle Vinales – professional basketball player
 Mike Watkins – professional basketball player

References

External links
 

Boys' schools in Pennsylvania
Private high schools in Pennsylvania
Schools in Chester County, Pennsylvania
Educational institutions established in 1946
1946 establishments in Pennsylvania